Visalia Municipal Airport  is five miles west of downtown Visalia, in Tulare County, California, United States. The airport is eligible for the Essential Air Service program, but has no scheduled air service, and is not eligible to request funding for service until April 30, 2026.

The Federal Aviation Administration says this airport had 1,831 passenger boardings (enplanements) in calendar year 2010, a decrease from 2,455 in 2009. The National Plan of Integrated Airport Systems for 2011–2015 categorized it as a general aviation airport (the commercial service category requires 2,500 enplanements per year).

History
Visalia Municipal Airport was built in 1927 and purchased by the city in 1928.

The Works Progress Administration (WPA) began several projects at the Visalia Municipal Airport in 1936, and would continue to make improvements at the field.

The War Department assumed control of the airport in February 1942, just weeks after Japan's attack on Pearl Harbor, which led the United States to enter World War II. The airport was renamed the Visalia Army Air Field (Visalia AAF) and operations at the facility began almost immediately upon the United States Army Air Forces control of the airfield. Anti-submarine patrols were conducted from Visalia AAF by the 47th Bombardment Squadron (Medium) using Lockheed A-29 Hudson, and later B-25 Mitchell medium bombers.

In June 1942, the Visalia AAF was established as a sub-installations of the newly built Hammer Field in Fresno (along with Hayward AAF and Palmdale AAF). It shared Hammer Field's mission to train light, medium and heavy bomber squadrons. During that period Consolidated B-24 "Liberator", B-25s, Martin B-26 "Marauder" and the A-29s operated from Visalia AAF.

In January 1944, Army Air Forces headquarters ordered the entire Air University night fighter training program to California to be headquartered at Hammer Field. Under the supervision of the Army Air Force School of Applied Tactics (AAFSAT) and the 481st Night Fighter Operational Training Group, night fighter crews were organized into Overseas Training Units and entered three phases of training. In all phases, Visalia AAF was used as a satellite training site. During this period, Douglas P-70 "Nighthawk" (heavy night fighter version of the A-20 "Havoc" light bomber) and Northrop P-61 "Black Widow" operated from Visalia AAF. It is known that the 425th Night Fighter Squadron was stationed at Visalia AAF for its entire training cycle from February until May 1944 when it was deployed to the European Theater at RAF Charmy Down, England as part of the Ninth Air Force.

In 1946 the War Assets Administration, acting on behalf of the War Department, terminated the leases with the City of Visalia and other parties with the remainder of the lands transferred to the City of Visalia between 1946 and 1947.

United Airlines mainline flights began in 1946 and ended in November 1979.

After the deregulation of the airline industry in 1978, Visalia Municipal Airport became eligible for the Essential Air Service (EAS) program. Since then Air Midwest, Great Lakes Airlines, Scenic Airlines, SeaPort Airlines, SkyWest Airlines, Swift Aire Lines, and Wings West Airlines served the airport with EAS funding support, but none were successful.

SeaPort Airlines was the most recent airline at Visalia. Starting February 9, 2015, SeaPort operated 12 nonstop round trips a week to Burbank and Sacramento. The airline suspended its service without notice on January 15, 2016.

After the abrupt cancellation of commercial air service, the US Department of Transportation received proposals from three other airlines to start service from Visalia using EAS funding, but the city rejected the offers, believing that none of the carriers had a strong enough proposal. Instead, in January 2017, the city asked to be enrolled in the Essential Air Service Community Flexibility Pilot Program which allows communities to receive a cash grant equal to two years worth of subsidy in exchange for forgoing their EAS funding for the next ten years. Visalia was the first community ever to enroll in the program which had been established more than a decade earlier in 2003. In March 2017, Visalia received a grant worth $3,703,368 for the construction of two 10-unit tee hangars to serve small single-engine aircraft, and one corporate hangar to serve business jets and large aircraft. In exchange, the city will be ineligible to receive EAS subsidy funding for service until April 30, 2026.

Visalia Transit operates the V-LINE bus service connecting the Visalia Airport to Downtown Visalia, Downtown Fresno, California State University, Fresno and the Fresno Yosemite International Airport. The route started on November 18, 2015, but since the cancellation of commercial air service in Visalia, free extended parking (up to 10 days) has been offered at the Visalia Airport main terminal lot, where can then ride the bus to Fresno's airport.

Facilities 
Visalia Municipal Airport covers 821 acres (332 ha) at an elevation of 295 feet (90 m). It has one asphalt runway, 12/30, 6,559 by 150 feet (1,999 x 46 m), and one helipad 45 by 45 feet (14 x 14 m).

In the year ending April 28, 2011 the airport had 63,900 aircraft operations, average 175 per day: 92% general aviation, 4% airline, 4% air taxi, and <1% military. 134 aircraft were then based at this airport: 78% single-engine, 18% multi-engine, 4% jet, and 1% glider.

Airlines and destinations

Cargo

See also

 California World War II Army Airfields

References

Other sources

 Essential Air Service documents (Docket DOT-OST-2004-19916) from the U.S. Department of Transportation:
 Order 2005-4-25 (April 28, 2005): selecting Eagle Canyon Airlines, Inc., d/b/a Scenic Airlines, to provide essential air service at Visalia, California, at the annual subsidy rate of $450,000 per year for the first two years and $300,000 for the third year beginning with its inauguration of service.
 Order 2006-8-29 (August 30, 2006): selecting Mesa Air Group Inc. d/b/a Air Midwest to provide subsidized essential air service (EAS) at Merced and Visalia, California, and Ely, Nevada, for two years, beginning when the carrier inaugurates service. Merced and Visalia will receive 23 weekly round trips to Las Vegas, operated on a Las Vegas - Merced - Visalia - Las Vegas or Las Vegas - Visalia - Merced - Las Vegas routing at an annual subsidy rate of $1,599,207. Ely will receive 6 nonstop round trips each week to Salt Lake City at an annual subsidy rate of $647,709. Air Midwest will operate as America West Express/US Airways Express and serve each community with 19-passenger Beech 1900-D aircraft.
 Order 2008-6-26 (June 19, 2008): selecting Great Lakes Aviation, Ltd. to provide subsidized essential air service (EAS) at Merced and Visalia, California, and Ely, Nevada, for the two-year period beginning when the carrier inaugurates full EAS pursuant to this Order, at an annual subsidy of $4,900,401 with 19-seat Beech 1900D turboprop aircraft.
 Order 2010-9-13 (September 9, 2010): re-selecting Great Lakes Aviation, Ltd., to provide subsidized essential air service (EAS) with 19-passenger Beechcraft-B-1900D aircraft at Merced and Visalia, California, and Ely, Nevada, for the two-year period from October 1, 2010, through September 31, 2012. The annual subsidy rates will be set at $1,961,174, $1,746,507, and $1,752,067 for Merced, Visalia and Ely, respectively, for a combined total of $5,459,748.
 Order 2012-9-9 (September 10, 2012): re-selecting Great Lakes Aviation, Ltd., to provide subsidized Essential Air Service (EAS) with 19-passenger Beechcraft B-1900D aircraft at Merced and Visalia, California, for the two-year period from October 1, 2012, through September 31, 2014. The annual subsidy rates will be set at $1,698,878 and $1,697,929, for Merced and Visalia, respectively, for a combined total of $3,396,807.

External links
 Visalia Municipal Airport, official website
 Great Lakes Aviation
 Aerial image as of May 1994 from USGS The National Map
 

Airports in Tulare County, California
Essential Air Service
San Joaquin Valley
Airfields of the United States Army Air Forces in California
Works Progress Administration in California
Airports established in 1927
1927 establishments in California